Susanne Themlitz (born 1968) is an installation artist who has Portuguese and German nationality. She has exhibited widely in Portugal, Germany and Spain.

Early life and education
Susanne S.D. Themlitz was born in Lisbon, Portugal in 1968. She studied drawing and sculpture at the Centre for Art and Visual Communication (AR.CO) in Lisbon, between 1987 and 1993, with one of those years spent at the Royal College of Art in London. She obtained a master's degree in Fine Arts at the Kunstakademie Düsseldorf in Germany in 1995, on a Calouste Gulbenkian Foundation fellowship.

Career
Themlitz lives and works in Lisbon and Cologne in Germany. She exhibited for the first time in 1992 at the Calouste Gulbenkian Museum in Lisbon. Since then, she has had solo exhibitions in Lisbon, Porto, Elvas, Tavira, Ponte de Sor, Sines and Caldas da Rainha in Portugal; Cologne, Berlin, and Meerbusch in Germany; Paris and Lyon in France; and Madrid, Badajoz, Santander, Las Palmas, and Cáceres in Spain.

The work of Themlitz involves installations that create fantasy by using different media and materials, either individually or combined. She uses drawing, sculpture, photography, video, installation, and painting. Her work makes reference to literature and cinema, children's stories, mythology, and science fiction, combined with her observations on human beings and their personalities.

Her art is included in several collections. In addition to that of the Gulbenkian Foundation, these include those of the Caixa Geral de Depósitos, the Serralves Foundation, the Museum of Contemporary Art of Elvas and the Museum of Contemporary Art of Funchal, among others in Portugal, and in foreign collections such as the Museo Extremeño e Iberoamericano de Arte Contemporáneo in Badajoz and the Museo de Arte Moderno y Contemporáneo de Santander y Cantabria in Santander.

References

1968 births
Living people
20th-century Portuguese women artists
21st-century Portuguese women artists
People from Lisbon
Kunstakademie Düsseldorf alumni